Hasha, also known as Yashi, is a Plateau language of Nasarawa State Nigeria. It has an idiosyncratic system of reduplicating the first syllable of noun stems, apparently under the influence of the Chadic language Sha.

Hasha is spoken by about 3,000 people in Kwààn (Yàshì Sarki; Bwora), which is the main settlement, and also in the two nearby villages of Hàshàsu (Yàshì Pá) and Hùsù (Yàshì Madaki; Kusu).

References

Blench (2008) Prospecting proto-Plateau. Manuscript.

Languages of Nigeria
Alumic languages